The 2021 Chooks-to-Go Pilipinas 3x3 season is the third season of the Chooks-to-Go Pilipinas 3x3 basketball league. The season only consist of a one-day invitational tournament. The tournament was won by Manila HeiHei.

Venue
The invitational tournament was held at the Laus Events Center in San Fernando, Pampanga.

Teams
The following teams took part in the invitational tournament.

Manila HeiHei
Pacquiao Coffee Bacolod
BRT Sumisip Basilan
Homegrown Grains Bocaue
AMACOR Mandaluyong
RBR Cabiao Nueva Ecija
Pasig Kingpins
Adam Esli Pasay
MNL Kingpin Quezon City
Essen Immunoboost Sarangani
Zamboanga Valientes
ARQ Builders Cebu

Manila HeiHei is the same team as Manila Chooks which takes part in the FIBA 3x3 Men's Pro Circuit.

Tournament
The invitational tournament was held on October 20, 2021. The 3×3 World Tour format was adopted with the participating teams allocated to groups of three in the first round. The top two teams in each group advanced to the knockout playoffs. Teams are permitted to have foreign players in their rosters. Manila HeiHei won 21–6 over the Pasig Kingpins in the final. Essen Immunoboost Sarangani finished third.

Imports
Foreign players or imports are allowed to take part in the tournament. Imports were permitted to play to accommodate foreign student-athletes who had been inactive and/or stranded in the country due to the COVID-19 pandemic.

References

Chooks-to-Go Pilipinas 3x3
2020–21 in Philippine basketball leagues